"Thank You for the Music" is a song by the Swedish pop group ABBA. It was originally featured on the group's fifth studio album, The Album (1977), and was released as a double-A sided single with "Eagle" in May 1978 in limited territories, namely Belgium, the Netherlands, Germany, France, Austria, Switzerland and Australia. In South Africa where it peaked at number 2 in August 1978 and became the eighteenth best-selling single of that year.

"Gracias por la Música" is the Spanish-language recording of "Thank You for the Music", with lyrics by Buddy and Mary McCluskey. The B-side was the Spanish-language version of "Gimme! Gimme! Gimme! (A Man After Midnight)" entitled "¡Dame! ¡Dame! ¡Dame!". The song was released in 1980 to promote the band's Spanish-language album/compilation Gracias Por La Música. It was the group's seventh best-selling Spanish single, and also peaked at number 4 in Argentina.

"Thank You for the Music" also formed part of ABBA: The Movie which featured studio recordings of selected songs from the then newly released album ABBA: The Album. The song is included in the final scenes as the hapless journalist finally gets to broadcast his ABBA radio special, including an interview, on Australian radio. The song is accompanied by footage of a studio recording session, a live stage performance and a mimed studio performance by the four members of the group. The song also plays over the closing titles as the camera pans out from the band performing in a hut on an island in the Stockholm archipelago to views of the archipelago itself.

The song was re-released in November 1983, to promote the Epic Records compilation album of the same name.

History
The recording of "Thank You for the Music" started in Marcus Music Studio in Stockholm, 2 June 1977. The group had also performed the tune at their concert tour through Europe and Australia during the spring of 1977, as part of a mini musical "The Girl with the Golden Hair" where the song was used as an ending encore. The lyrics used in this live version were slightly different from the studio version recorded later. Before the tour, in December 1976, Andersson and Ulvaeus also performed a segment of the melody on piano and acoustic guitar on the Swedish evening news programme "Rapport".

The first recording of the tune had a jazzy cabaret feel with Agnetha Fältskog on solo song, inspired by artists in the style of Doris Day and similar. The group later made another arrangement of the same melody, which became the more widely known version. The first version was released in its entirety on the 1994 CD-box "Thank You for the Music". The later version was recorded 21 July 1977 in Glen Studio (a family studio that used to be located in the Glenmark family home but now relocated to a small former grocery shop close to their home).

The song was included on "The Album" and was used as a final melody in the film "ABBA - The Movie", which had its premiere at Christmas of 1977. The single "Eagle" of May 1978 also had this song as its B-side. It was later included on "Greatest Hits Vol. 2" released fall of 1979, when ABBA started touring North America and Europe. A promotion video was recorded in February 1978, directed by Lasse Hallström, where ABBA sings "Thank You for the Music" in front of kids singing along.

"Thank You for the Music" was later included on "ABBA Gold - Greatest Hits" of 1992. In 1999, it was used for the musical "Mamma Mia!", and in 2008 for the film with the same title. When the musical was translated to Swedish by Niklas Strömstedt, it got the title "Tack för alla sånger".

Reception
It was not released as a single in the United Kingdom and Ireland until late 1983, peaking at number 33 and number 17 respectively, despite being released in both a poster sleeve and a picture disc in addition to the regular version. The low chart placings could be attributed to ABBA's declining popularity since their last Top 10 hit in 1981. Because of the song's inclusion on ABBA: The Album and Greatest Hits Vol.2 (both of which topped the UK charts), as well as being performed by the band during their world tours, it can be said that "Thank You for the Music" had been heard by fans and the like many times up to this point. The title itself is often also taken to signal the end of ABBA, leading it to be considered a farewell song. In the Netherlands, the song peaked at number 23.

As of September 2021, it is ABBA's 20th-biggest song in the UK, including both pure sales and digital streams.

Charts

Weekly charts

Year-end charts

Certifications

Personnel
ABBA
 Agnetha Fältskog – lead and backing vocals
 Anni-Frid Lyngstad – backing vocals
 Björn Ulvaeus – backing vocals, acoustic rhythm guitar, mandolin
 Benny Andersson – backing vocals, keyboards
Additional personnel and production staff
 Lasse Wellander – acoustic lead guitar, mandolin
 Rutger Gunnarsson – bass  
 Roger Palm – drums, tambourine

Cover versions
 The Carpenters
 Irish siblings The Nolans, who were often seen on various British variety TV programmes in the 1970s and early 1980s, recorded their own cover of this song. It is included on their album Nolan Sisters.
 German eurodance group E-Rotic recorded a cover of the song for their 1997 ABBA tribute album Thank You for the Music.
 The 2001 compilation ABBAMetal (also released as A Tribute to ABBA) features a cover by German power metal band Metalium.
 British vocalist Dame Vera Lynn recorded a version of this song for her self-titled album.
 The song's chorus was included as part of a medley entitled "Thank ABBA for the Music" on the 1999 compilation ABBAmania, which coincided with a British TV special.  It was performed by Tina Cousins, Billie Piper, Steps, Cleopatra and B*Witched, and peaked on the UK Singles Chart at number 4 in April 1999.
 The subsequent ABBAMania 2 album from 2004 contains a cover of the song performed with British TV actors Charlotte Bellamy, Jane Danson, Wendi Peters, Bernie Nolan (of the Nolans), Tricia Penrose, Will Mellor, and Lee Otway on lead vocals.
 A cover of the song is included on the 2004 tribute album Funky ABBA by Swedish jazz musician Nils Landgren.  However, this version omits everything except for the first verse and chorus.
 The German 2004 ABBA Mania compilation features a cover version performed by all the music artists who appeared in the TV special, with Barbara Schöneberger on lead vocals.
 American actress/singer Jan Gelberman recorded a cover of the song for her album With Love To Share.
 Swedish opera singer Anne Sofie von Otter's cover of the song was included as a bonus track on her 2006 ABBA tribute album I Let The Music Speak.
 Filipino actress/singer Lea Salonga recorded a cover of the song when she was a child on her album Small Voice (1981) and later on her live DVD Your Songs (2009)
 A cover of the song was recorded by the finalists in the Dutch version of the music reality series Idols in 2006.  This version includes vocals by the eventual winner of that season, Raffaëla Paton.
 A cover of the song by Finnish a cappella choral ensemble Rajaton can be found on their 2006 ABBA tribute album Rajaton Sings ABBA With Lahti Symphony Orchestra.
In the soundtrack for the 2008 movie adaptation of the stage musical Mamma Mia!, the song is included as a hidden track sung by actress Amanda Seyfried. In the movie itself, it is heard in the end credits.
In August 2008, Gunilla Backman performed Björn Ulvaeus' Swedish version of the song from Mamma Mia! ("Tack för alla sånger") on TV show Allsång på Skansen (Sing-along at Skansen). It may be notable for the lyric which in the English version is "Thanks for all the joy they're bringing / Who can live without it" but in Swedish is "Vem behöver religioner? / Dom kan vi va utan" which roughly translates as "Who needs religion? / We can live without it", the line continuing with (roughly translated) "but never without music".
Hyperpop artist Gameboi covered the song as "Thank U 4 The Music" in 2019 produced by Evun

Live covers and appearances in other media
 A live version was performed on TV by The Carpenters on The Tonight Show hosted by John Davidson, on 27 June 1978. They first heard the song when ABBA performed it on Starparade, as the Carpenters were sharing the bill with them for that particular episode.  They laid down a track for it but Richard said:  Nobody does ABBA like ABBA.  I realized that, as usual, Benny and Bjorn had done the definitive arrangement and all I'd be doing was copying it; something I just don't do, of course. It's an outtake, never completed and in storage with the rest of the stuff in Pennsylvania. Fans have been requesting for years that Richard Carpenter release the Carpenters' version.
 They performed the song live on the Mike Yarwood Christmas show 1978 
 The song is performed in the Mamma Mia! musical by the characters of Sophie and Harry.  However, it omits the first verse of the original song. In the context of the musical, Harry is reminiscing about his younger, carefree days. At the same time, Sophie is letting the potential fathers get to know her better. She expresses how much she loves to sing and dance. In order to coincide with the lyric, "I'm the girl with golden hair," Sophie's hair colour is usually blonde. "The Girl with Golden Hair" was a mini-musical that Benny and Bjorn wrote which ABBA performed during their 1977 tour of Europe and Australia. It is also sung by Amanda Seyfried in the end credits of the 2008 Universal Picture. 
 American singer Deborah Boily recorded a live performance of the song for her album Thank You for the Music.
 All participants on the TV show Chuva de Estrelas for the channel SIC during the early 1990s sang a version of this song in the end of the show.
 A live version was performed by Norwegian art band, Hurra Torpedo.
 The song is briefly included in the ABBA medley performed by Alan Partridge on his mock chat show Knowing Me Knowing You, which is itself titled after the ABBA single of the same name. One of the show's running gags is based around the character's fondness of the band. 
 16-year-old Zoe Birkett performed a rendition of the song on the final 6 round of hit series Pop Idol, in 2002.
 In the 2003 comedy film Johnny English starring Rowan Atkinson, it is briefly sung in the dark as an echo chant.
 The song was sung on Australian Idol season 6 by Teale Jakubenko during ABBA week.
 In the "French and Saunders: Still Alive" farewell tour in 2008, both Dawn French and Jennifer Saunders perform the song to close the show with Dawn choosing to send herself up by making noises instead of actually singing in some parts.
 Several ABBA cover bands end their concerts with "Thank You for the Music", as a tribute to the original group.
The horror novel Little Star by John Ajvide Lindqvist opens with a quote from "Thank You for the Music". The song is also featured heavily throughout the novel and guides the climax of the story.
This song was the last song played on music channels The Hits before it became 4Music, and MTV OMG.
This song was the last song played on Indonesian national free-to-air terrestrial channels O Channel before it officially new renamed to becomes Moji.
This song was used on the good night song and closedown music of KTV Jabodetabek, Elshinta TV Jabodetabek, MYTV Jabodetabek (Amanda Seyfried only because due to in the soundtrack for the 2008 movie adaptation of the stage musical Mamma Mia!, the song is included as a hidden track sung by actress Amanda Seyfried. In the movie itself, it is heard in the end credits.), Moji Jabodetabek, Kompas TV Jakarta and Jabodetabek, TVRI Jabodetabek, NET. Jabodetabek, JakTV Jabodetabek and tvOne Jabodetabek based in Jabodetabek and surrounding areas.

References

External links
 Lyrics of this song
 

1977 songs
1978 singles
1983 singles
ABBA songs
The Carpenters songs
The Nolans songs
Polar Music singles
Songs written by Benny Andersson and Björn Ulvaeus
Music videos directed by Lasse Hallström
Songs about music
1970s ballads